The 1942 Connecticut Huskies football team represented the University of Connecticut in the 1942 college football season.  The Huskies were led by ninth-year head coach J. Orlean Christian and completed the season with a record of 6–2.  No team would be fielded in 1943 due to World War II.

Schedule

References

Connecticut
UConn Huskies football seasons
Connecticut Huskies football